Breakout is a 1959 British crime drama film directed by Peter Graham Scott and starring Lee Patterson, Hazel Court, Terence Alexander. A local government official leads a double life when organising a breakout from a prison.

Cast
 Lee Patterson as George Munro
 Hazel Court as Rita Arkwright
 Terence Alexander as Farrow
 William Lucas as Chandler
 John Paul as Arkwright
 Billie Whitelaw as Rose Munro
 Dermot Kelly as O'Quinn
 Estelle Brody as Maureen O'Quinn
 Rupert Davies as Morgan
 Lloyd Lamble as Inspector

Locations
Among the locations used in the film was the West End area of Aldershot in Hampshire. The gates of the East Cavalry Barracks on Barrack Road stood in for the prison gates used in the breakout. Other scenes were filmed in Uxbridge - then in Middlesex but now in Greater London.

Critical reception
Sky Movies noted a "Low-budget, but very tense prison escape thriller, with a suitably tough performance from Canadian-born actor Lee Patterson as the jailbreak expert. The suspense also owes a debt to edgy performances from a number of faces familiar in British films, including Hazel Court, John Paul, Billie Whitelaw, William Lucas, Rupert Davies, Dermot Kelly and Terence Alexander. A gripper."

References

External links
 

1959 films
1959 drama films
1950s English-language films
Films directed by Peter Graham Scott
British drama films
1950s British films